Survey Sampling International (SSI) performs consumer and business-to-business survey research.

History
SSI was founded in 1977 by Tom Danbury and Beverly Weiman.  In 2005, SSI acquired Bloomerce bv of the Netherlands, an online sampling company in Europe. SSI now manages proprietary online panels (under the names SurveySpot, Opinion Outpost, OpinionWorld, and Choozz).

In 2009, the firm played a role in launching the industry co-initiative, Research Voice.
Research Voice (www.research-voice.com) is a forum inviting all members of the marketing research chain—suppliers, researchers, end clients, consultants, associations, and participants themselves—to come together and express ideas on the development of innovative approaches to gathering opinions.

In July 2011, Survey Sampling International announced its merger with Utah-based Opinionology. Though a merger, the newly formed sampling and data collection company continues to operate under the SSI brand.

On December 17, 2014, HGGC, a middle market private equity firm announced it had completed its majority investment in the parent company of SSI. Though HGGC bought control of SSI, Providence Equity Partners and Sterling Investment Partners retained minority stakes in the business. Under the terms of the deal, Rich Lawson, HGGC's chief executive, became chairman of SSI. Steve Young, a former professional football quarterback who is a partner at the private equity firm, also joined the board.

As of February 2015, SSI had 25 global offices in 18 countries, with its corporate headquarters in Shelton, CT, USA. It has over 3,300 employees globally, and more than 3,000 customers, including market research and consulting firms, Fortune 500 businesses, and universities.

In December 2017, an SSI office in the New City Commercial Center, Davao City, Philippines was destroyed in the 2017 Davao City mall fire with the loss of 37 employees. 83 SSI employees survived. Charges were filed against SSI but later dropped. SSI CEO Gary Laben announced that the firm will arrange counseling for its employees and will assist in the funeral arrangements for the victims. Laben added that a fund will be created to assist the families of the victims.

As of October 2022, the url for SSI redirects to Dynata. It is unclear how this change came about, or whether Dynata continues to offer the services that SSI did.

References

External links 
 Survey Sampling International
 Survey Sampling International Opt-Out webpage

 ESOMAR

Market research companies of the United States